Jörgen Vilhelm Bergsøe (8 February 1835 - 26 June 1911) was a Danish entomologist who moved to Italy and became a novelist and poet.

Bergsøe was born in Copenhagen. He studied natural sciences, specializing in entomology and graduated in 1860 with a thesis was on a parasitic copepod Philichthys xiphiae described by Japetus Steenstrup. He later published a book on Pictures of Insect Life from Field and Wood (1915) and various papers, such as on centipedes, describing several new species. He suffered from poor eyesight, gave up entomology, and moved to Italy for better health and stayed on in Rome, Naples and Sicily writing historically located novels in the style of  A. M. Goldschmidt such as Italienske noveller ("Italian novels", 1874), Fra den gamble fabrik ("From the old factory", 1869 ); and Rom under Pius den niende ("Rome under Pius IX", 1877).

References

External links
 
 
 

1835 births
1911 deaths
People from Copenhagen
Danish entomologists